Bulldog Drummond's Bride is an American crime comedy thriller film produced in 1939. It was the last film of Paramount Pictures' Bulldog Drummond film series.

Plot
In London, a shape charge-wielding master criminal comes up with a foolproof plan for robbing a bank and outwitting Scotland Yard's pursuit, but during the getaway he hides his haul in a radio set in the new flat of Capt. Bulldog Drummond (John Howard) and his to-be wife Phyllis Clavering (Heather Angel), leading to a murder, punch-ups, an expedition to France, a night in a French jail cell and a break-out, in a race to reach Bulldog's fiancee.

Phyllis is waiting for Drummond in a French village with her aunt Blanche Clavering (Elizabeth Patterson), to be married the next day. She has sent a telegram, asking him to send her the radio, both unaware of its content. The villains meet their end in a roof-top fight and Bulldog finally ties the matrimonial knot in an explosive finale to his bachelorhood.

Cast
 John Howard as Captain Hugh Chesterton 'Bulldog' Drummond
 Heather Angel as Phyllis Clavering
 H.B. Warner as Col. J.A. Nielson
 Reginald Denny as Algy Longworth
 E.E. Clive as "Tenny" Tennison
 Elizabeth Patterson as Aunt Blanche Clavering
 Eduardo Ciannelli as Henri Armides
 Gerald Hamer as Garvey (Armides' Henchman)
 John Sutton as Inspector Tredennis
 Neil Fitzgerald as Evan Barrows
 Louis Mercier as Mayor Jean Philippe Napoleon Dupres
 Adia Kuznetzoff as Gaston
 Adrienne D'Ambricourt as Theresa
 Clyde Cook as Constable Sacker

See also
 Bulldog Drummond

References

External links
 
 
 
 

Films based on Bulldog Drummond
1939 films
American mystery films
1930s English-language films
American black-and-white films
1930s crime comedy films
Films directed by James Patrick Hogan
American crime comedy films
1930s mystery films
1939 comedy films
Films set in London
Paramount Pictures films
1930s American films